Vladislav Yuryevich Nikiforov (born 21 March 1989) is a Russian footballer who plays for FC SKA-Khabarovsk-2. He is versatile, he primarily plays as right midfielder, but can play on the left side as defender or winger.

Club career
He made his Russian Premier League debut for FC Khimki on 15 March 2008 in a game against FC Amkar Perm.

Career statistics

Notes

References

1989 births
Sportspeople from Khabarovsk Krai
People from Khabarovsk Krai
Living people
Russian footballers
Association football midfielders
Russia youth international footballers
Russia under-21 international footballers
FC Khimki players
FC SKA-Khabarovsk players
Russian Premier League players
Russian First League players
Russian Second League players